The Informer is a British drama series that starred Ian Hendry, it was broadcast in two series in 1966 and 1967. Most episodes are considered lost, but several have survived.

Plot
A former barrister Alex Lambert (played by Ian Hendry) who had been disgraced and debarred has to rebuild his life. He uses his former contacts on both sides of the law to become a paid informer for the Police. Living well from the rewards paid by insurance companies, Lambert still has to hide his activities from both his wife and others behind a new persona in the guise as a business consultant. Other regulars in the series included Jean Marsh, Neil Hallett and Heather Sears. Guest actors included Peter Bowles, Peter Vaughan, Trevor Bannister, George Cole, Nerys Hughes, David Kelly, Murray Melvin, Eric Pohlmann, John Carson, Nicholas Courtney, Dudley Foster, Tracy Reed and Roberta Tovey.

Currently, only "Get Off My Back", the first episode of season one, and "Your Money of Your Life", the penultimate episode of season two, exist in the archives. The rest of the series is missing, presumed wiped.

Episodes

1st series (1966)

2nd series (1967)

Cast List

References

External links

1960s British drama television series
1966 British television series debuts
1967 British television series endings
ITV television dramas
Television shows produced by Associated-Rediffusion
English-language television shows